Fielder may refer to:

Sports 
 Fielding (cricket), the action of fielders in collecting the ball after it is struck by the batsman
 Fielders, any of various baseball positions including:
 Infielder, a player positioned near first, second or third base
 Outfielder, a player positioned beyond the infield, including the left fielder, center fielder, and right fielder
 Lake County Fielders, baseball team based in Zion, Illinois

Places 
 Fielder Creek, a stream in the U.S. state of Oregon
 Fielder House, a historic house in Fordyce, Arkansas
 Fielder Mountain, a summit in the U.S. state of Oregon
 Fielder railway station, Melbourne
 Fielders Sports Ground, a cricket ground in Hornchurch, England
 Fielders Stadium, an unfinished baseball park in Zion, Illinois

Names 
 Fielder (surname)
 Fielder Cook (1923–2003), American television and film director, producer, and writer
 Fielder Jones (1871–1934), American center fielder and manager

Other uses 
 Toyota Fielder, a car model

See also
 Fielder's choice, a baseball play
 Fielding (disambiguation)